Nicole Shields (born 9 September 1999) is a New Zealand racing cyclist.

She competed at the 2016 Junior Track Cycling World Championships.

In December 2019, she won the gold medal in the women's team pursuit event, at the 2019 UCI Cycling Track World Cup. and silver medal in madison.

She competed with Subway New Zealand Track Team, and DNA Pro Cycling.

References

External links 
 

1996 births
Living people
New Zealand female cyclists
New Zealand track cyclists
Place of birth missing (living people)